Fanis Katergiannakis (born 16 February 1974) is a Greek former professional footballer who played as a goalkeeper.

Club career

Ethnikos Pylaias
Katergiannakis started his career in the young team for Ethnikos Pylaias a team in his town in Tracia. In the season 1992–93 Ethnikos Pylaias, with Katergiannakis as goalkeeper achieved a great season, gained the Greek Fourth Division. After that Katergiannakis received an offer from Aris Thessaloniki F.C. the mean club in Thessaloniki quite hard to refuse.

Aris
In the summer 1994, Katergiannakis signed for Aris Thessaloniki F.C. and in the season 1997–1998 Katergiannakis, achieved a great season becoming the first goalkeep and helping the team a soon the promotion to the Greek First Division. The next season made his great contribution to promote Aris Thessaloniki F.C. for the Uefa Cup and saved a penalty to Greek top scorer Demis Nikolaidis. The match of 27 January 2002 between Olympiacos and Aris Thessaloniki F.C., Katergiannakis saved so many opportunity from Stelios Giannakopoulos, Alexandros Alexandris, Predrag Đorđević, Christian Karembeu. The club of Thessaloniki won 1–0 in Athens and this was the only mach lost at home for Olympiacos that in that season won the Greek First Division and after this match few teams try to make a new contract for Katergiannakis.

Olympiacos
In the summer 2002 Katergiannakis signed a two-year contract with Olympiacos to become second goalkeeper behind Dimitrios Eleftheropoulos. He won the Greek Super League with Olympiacos in the 2002–03 season, after a big competition with the other goalkeeper Eleftheropoulos that he become injured during the match with the rival Panathinaikos. Katergiannakis became the first goalkeeper helping his new team to win the 7th consecutive Greek League and qualifying the team for UEFA Champions League and reached the final of Greek Cup against the Greek rival AEK Athens. The next season the coach Oleh Protasov declared that Katergiannakis and Eleftheropoulos were both titolare goalkeepers of the first team of Olympiacos. The coach Otto Rehhagel, called him up to the Greece national al team.

Cagliari Calcio
After he won Euro 2004 with Greece, the club of Olympiacos decided to acquire the legendary goalkeeper Antonis Nikopolidis. For the 2 goalkeepers there was less space and Dimitrios Eleftheropoulos signed for the Italian club Messina and Katergiannakis signed for another Italian club Cagliari in Serie A. Famous to be the first team of the main cities to win the league in Serie A. Katergiannakis in Cagliari, found players like David Suazo and the legendary Italian star Gianfranco Zola ready to help Cagliari Calcio to achieve a great season.

Iraklis
In the summer 2005, Katergiannakis signed a two-year contract with Iraklis. Katergiannakis here met Georgios Georgiadis, teammate in the Greece national football team in the Euro 2004 triumph. That year Iraklis finished in 4th place in the Greek First Division, qualifying for the UEFA Europa League.

Kavala
In the summer 2008, Katergiannakis signed for Kavala F.C. in Greek Second Division and he helped the team to gain the third place behind Antromitos and PAS Giannina and promote the team to the Greek Super League after a after ten-year absence. He was the goalkeeper to concede the least goals in the 2008–09 season. In the summer 2009, he also found in Kavala another player (Vassilios Lakis) with whom he won Euro 2004 with the Greece national football team, acquired by club to reinforce the team for the 2009–10 season.

on 17 February 2010, Katergiannakis reached the semifinals of the Greek Cup with Kavala, where he faced Aris, with whom he made his debut as a professional player.  He reached the sixth place in the Greek Super League with Kavala. In the summer of 2011, both Katergiannakis and Kavala decided to end the contract.

International career
He made his debut for the Greece national football team in November 1999 against Bulgaria replacing the Greek goalkeeper Antonis Nikopolidis. Katergiannakis was included in the national team that won Euro 2004 in Portugal with the other goalkeepers Antonis Nikopolidis and Konstantinos Chalkias.

After retirement
In November 2018, he become the Goalkeeping Coach	of the Greece national football team.

Honours
Olympiacos
Greek Championship: 2003

Aris
Greek Second Division: 1998

Kavala
Greek Second Division: 2008

Greece
European Championship: 2004

Individual
Greek Best Goalkeeper of the Beta Division: 2009

References

1974 births
Living people
Greek footballers
Greek expatriate footballers
Footballers from Thessaloniki
Association football goalkeepers
Aris Thessaloniki F.C. players
Olympiacos F.C. players
Iraklis Thessaloniki F.C. players
Kavala F.C. players
Serie A players
Cagliari Calcio players
Expatriate footballers in Italy
UEFA Euro 2004 players
UEFA European Championship-winning players
Greece international footballers
Greek expatriate sportspeople in Italy
Super League Greece players